
Year 665 (DCLXV) was a common year starting on Wednesday (link will display the full calendar) of the Julian calendar. The denomination 665 for this year has been used since the early medieval period, when the Anno Domini calendar era became the prevalent method in Europe for naming years.

Events 
 By place 

 Europe 
 Kubrat, ruler (khagan) of Great Bulgaria, dies after a 33-year reign. He is succeeded by his son Batbayan, who rules from Poltava (modern Ukraine) the lands north of the Black Sea and the Sea of Azov. 

 Britain 
 Conflict erupts between King Sighere of Essex and his brother Sæbbi, as they struggle for overlordship between Mercia and Wessex. 

 Arabian Empire 
 Muslim Conquest: An Arab army (40,000 men) advances through the desert and captures the Byzantine city of Barca (Libya).

 Asia 
 The city of Seongnam (South Korea) is renamed Hansanju (approximate date).
 Wu Zetian, the wife of the Chinese emperor, unofficially becomes an absolute ruler by eliminating her political rivals.

 By topic 

 Religion 
 Wilfrid, Anglo-Saxon abbot, refuses to be consecrated in Northumbria as bishop, and travels to Compiègne (France) to be consecrated by Agilbert, archbishop of Paris.
 Jaruman, bishop of Mercia, is dispatched with Christian missionaries to reconvert Saxon tribes, which have returned to paganism.
 According to the Annales Cambriae, the Anglo-Saxons convert to Christianity after the Second Battle of Badon.
 Sighere encourages his subjects to reject Christianity and return to their indigenous religion (approximate date).

Science
 Brahmagupta writes his Khandakhadyaka.

Births 
 Ōtomo no Tabito, Japanese poet (d. 729)
 Sa'id ibn Jubayr, Muslim scholar (d. 714)

Deaths 
 April 16 – Fructuosus of Braga, French archbishop
 Féchín of Fore, Irish monk and saint
 Hafsa bint Umar, wife of Muhammad 
 Kubrat, ruler (khagan) of Great Bulgaria
 Li Zhong, prince of the Tang Dynasty (b. 643)
 Yu Zhining, chancellor of the Tang Dynasty (b. 588)

References

Sources